Public Morals is an American sitcom that aired on the CBS network in October 1996. Created and executive produced by Steven Bochco and Jay Tarses, the series was poorly received and was canceled after airing only one episode.

Synopsis
The show is based around a group of mismatched detectives and others in New York City's vice squad. Among the actors who appear in the series are Peter Gerety and Donal Logue. Bill Brochtrup's character John Irvin, an administrative assistant, had been imported into the show from the drama NYPD Blue, and would return to NYPD Blue after the cancellation of Public Morals. Both Public Morals and NYPD Blue were produced by Steven Bochco.

Cast
 Peter Gerety as Lieutenant Neil Fogarty
 Donal Logue as Detective Ken Schuler
 Bill Brochtrup as John Irvin
 Julianne Christie as Detective Corinne O'Boyle
 Jana Marie Hupp as Sergeant Val Vandergoodt
 Joseph Latimore as Officer Darnell "Shag" Ruggs
 Justin Louis as Detective Mickey Crawford
 Larry Romano as Detective Richie Biondi

Reception
The original pilot episode of Public Morals was scrapped because critics and some CBS affiliates believed the language was too vulgar. However, the episode that did air was also poorly received. Critics argued that the characters were one-dimensional and that some of the humor involved racial stereotypes.

Episodes

The fifth episode, The White Cover, was originally the pilot.

References

External links
 
 

1990s American sitcoms
1996 American television series debuts
1997 American television series endings
CBS original programming
English-language television shows
Fictional portrayals of the New York City Police Department
1990s American police comedy television series
Television series canceled after one episode
Television shows set in New York City
Television shows filmed in Los Angeles